Peter Riebensahm (born 30 May 1938) is a German athlete. He competed in the men's high jump at the 1960 Summer Olympics.

References

1938 births
Living people
Athletes (track and field) at the 1960 Summer Olympics
German male high jumpers
Olympic athletes of the United Team of Germany
People from Braniewo